The 1585 papal conclave (21–24 April), convoked after the death of Pope Gregory XIII, elected Cardinal Felice Peretti Montalto (O.F.M.Conv), who took the name Sixtus V. Forty-two of the sixty cardinals participated in the conclave. The absence of thirty percent of the cardinalate makes this conclave one of the most sparsely attended in the history of the modern Roman Catholic Church. Fourteen of Gregory XIII's thirty cardinals failed to attend, a startlingly high number.

Proceedings

The conclave began in the Vatican on 21 April, Easter Sunday. At the opening ceremonies, out of sixty living cardinals thirty-nine were in attendance. Three more arrived later, in time to cast a vote: Andreas of Austria, Ludovico Madruzzo of Trent, and Guido Luca Ferrero of Vercelli. Two factions quickly formed. The first was led by Cardinal Ferdinando de' Medici and the second by Luigi d'Este (grandson of King Louis XII of France). They were willing to combine to make a pope, but it depended on whether they could agree on a common candidate.

Early voting seemed to favour Cardinals Pier Donato Cesi and Guglielmo Sirleto, but by the next morning they had been abandoned. Wanting to avoid the potential influence of cardinals who had not yet arrived, Medici then proposed two names to D' Este: those of Cardinals Albani and Montalto, and invited him to choose. D' Este imposed conditions, however, and the projected deal, when news got out, caused much indignation. Through a series of misdirections and stratagems, Medici convinced the cardinals that Montalto was not his candidate.

Ludovico Cardinal Madruzzo, who was the designated leader of the Spanish faction, then arrived in Rome and had conversations with the Spanish and Imperial ambassadors before he entered conclave. Meeting immediately with d' Este, Madruccio learned of d' Este's dislike of his own favorite, Sirleto. Considering that a completely pro-Spanish pope would be as unpalatable as a completely pro-French one, he therefore declared himself to d'Este to be against Cardinal Albani, and thus in favor of Montalto. Altemps, Medici and Gesualdo then put pressure on Madruccio as well, and he was won over. As leader of the Spanish interest, he brought his own influence to bear on Andrew of Austria, Colonna, Deza (Seza), Gonzaga, Sfondrati and Spinola. With all of these adherents, Medici and d'Este still needed four votes. These could only be had in the group of Gregory XIII's cardinals organized by Alessandro Farnese, the Dean of the College of Cardinals. During that night, Cardinal Ferrero arrived.

On 24 April Medici explained to Montalto all that had been done, and advised him as to how affairs should be conducted. D'Este met with Farnese, who believed that Montalto had no voting strength, and managed to further misdirect him. During a meeting in the Pauline Chapel, d' Este recruited Guastavillani, the Cardinal Camerlengo; Giambattista Castagna, the Cardinal of San Marcello; and Francesco Sforza. When the cardinals finally assembled in the Sistine Chapel, d' Este declared that it was not necessary to proceed to a ballot, since it was obvious who the new pope was. Without opposition the cardinals proceeded to do hommage ('adoration') to Felice Cardinal Peretti though, immediately afterwards, a vote was conducted by asking each cardinal to cast his vote aloud. The vote was unanimous. Cardinal François de Joyeuse arrived in Rome too late to participate in the Conclave.

The coronation of Sixtus V took place on May 1. As senior cardinal deacon Cardinal de' Medici placed the tiara on his head. On May 5, he took possession of the Lateran.

Composition of the conclave

Participants

Alessandro Farnese, Bishop of Ostia and Velletri, Dean of the Sacred College of Cardinals 
Giacomo Savelli, Vicar of Rome, Bishop of Porto and Santa Rufina 
Giovanni Antonio Serbelloni, Bishop of Frascati 
Alfonso Gesualdo, Bishop of Albano 
Gianfrancesco Gambara, Bishop of Palestrina 
Girolamo Simoncelli 
Mark Sittich von Hohenems Altemps, Bishop of Constance 
Luigi d'Este, Archbishop of Auch 
Ludovico Madruzzo 
Innico d'Avalos d'Aragona 
Ferdinando de' Medici 
Marco Antonio Colonna
Tolomeo Gallio 
Prospero Santacroce
Guido Luca Ferrero
Guglielmo Sirleto 
Gabriele Paleotti, Archbishop of Bologna 
Michele Bonelli 
Antonio Carafa 
Giulio Antonio Santorio 
Pier Donato Cesi
Charles d'Angennes de Rambouillet, Bishop of Le Mans 
Felice Peretti Montalto OFM (elected as Pope Sixtus V) 
Girolamo Rusticucci
Nicolas de Pellevé, Archbishop of Sens 
Gian Girolamo Albani
Filippo Boncompagni
Filippo Guastavillani, Camerlengo
Andrea d'Austria, Bishop of Brixen 
Alessandro Riario, Titular Patriarch of Alexandria
Pedro de Deza
Giovanni Vincenzo Gonzaga
Giovanni Antonio Facchinetti de Nuce, Patriarch of Jerusalem 
Giambattista Castagna, Papal Legate to Bologna 
Alessandro Ottaviano de' Medici, Archbishop of Florence 
Giulio Canani, Bishop of Adria 
Niccolò Sfondrati, Bishop of Cremona 
Antonmaria Salviati 
Filippo Spinola, Bishop of Nola 
Matthieu Cointerel, 
Scipione Lancelotti
Francesco Sforza

Absent cardinals

The following cardinals did not attend the conclave:
Niccolò Caetani.
Georges d'Armagnac, archbishop of Toulouse, France.
Charles II de Bourbon-Vendôme, archbishop of Rouen, France.
Antoine Perrenot de Granvelle, archbishop of Besançon, France, and bishop of Sabina.
Albrecht von Austria.
Louis II de Guise, archbishop of Reims, France.
Charles II de Lorraine de Vaudémont, administrator of Toul, and Verdun, France.
Gaspar de Quiroga y Vela, archbishop of Toledo, Spain.
Rodrigo de Castro Osorio, archbishop of Seville, Spain.
François de Joyeuse, archbishop of Narbonne, France.
Michele Della Torre, bishop of Ceneda.
Agostino Valier, bishop of Verona.
Vincenzo Lauro, bishop of Mondovi.
Alberto Bolognetti, Bishop of Massa Marittima.
Jerzy Radziwill, bishop of Wilno, Lithuania.
Simeone Tagliavia d'Aragonia.
Charles III de Bourbon de Vendôme, coadjutor archbishop of Rouen, France.
Andrew Báthory, bishop of Ermland, Prussia.

References

Sources 
 Ludwig von Pastor, History of the Popes vol. XIX, London 1930
Giuseppe de Novaes, Elementi della storia de' sommi pontefici da San Pietro sino al ... Pio Papa VII;   third edition, Volume 8 (Roma 1822) 103–106. 
L. Ranke, The Ecclesiastical and Political History of the Popes of Rome during the sixteenth and seventeenth centuries Volume I (tr. S. Austin) (Philadelphia 1841)
Giovanni Leti, Vita di Sisto Quinto, pontefice romano Volume II (Torino 1852) 40–86

1585 in the Papal States
1585
16th-century elections
1585 in politics
16th-century Catholicism
1585 in Europe
Pope Sixtus V